The Citizens' Convergence (Convergencia Ciudadana) is a progressive political party in Colombia. 
At the last legislative elections, 10 March 2002, the party won as one of the many small parties parliamentary representation. In the election of 2006, the party won 8 out of 166 Deputies and 7 out of 100 senators. This party is now the National Integration Party (Colombia).

Progressive parties in Colombia